Nikos Grammatikos (born 13 October 1969) is a Greek former handball player and current coach. He competed at the 2004 Summer Olympics and at the 2005 World Championship.

References

External links
 

1969 births
Living people
Greek male handball players
Olympic handball players of Greece
Handball players at the 2004 Summer Olympics
Sportspeople from Piraeus